Minuscule 872 (in the Gregory-Aland numbering), ε 203 (von Soden), is a 12th-century Greek minuscule manuscript of the New Testament on parchment. The manuscript has no complex context. It has full marginalia.

Description 

The codex contains the text of the four Gospels with some lacunae (Matthew 6:4-21; John 13:16-21:25) on 180 parchment leaves (size ). The text is written in two columns per page, 26 lines per page.

There is also a division according to the Ammonian Sections (in Mark 233 Sections, the last in 16:8), with references to the Eusebian Canons.

Text 
The Greek text of the codex is an eclectic. Hermann von Soden classified it to the textual family Iηb. Kurt Aland did not place it in any Category.
According to the Claremont Profile Method it represents the textual family Kx in Luke 1, Luke 10, and Luke 20.

In the Gospel of Mark it represents the textual family f1.

History 

F. H. A. Scrivener dated the manuscript to the 11th or 12th century, C. R. Gregory dated it to the 12th century. Currently the manuscript is dated by the INTF to the 12th century.

According to the note the manuscript once belonged to Emilio H. F. Alteri in Rome in 1871.

The manuscript was added to the list of New Testament manuscripts by Scrivener (690e), Gregory (872e). Gregory saw it in 1886.

Currently the manuscript is housed at the Vatican Library (Gr. 2160), in Rome.

See also 

 List of New Testament minuscules
 Biblical manuscript
 Textual criticism
 Minuscule 871

References

Further reading

External links 
 
 Digitised codex NTVMR

Greek New Testament minuscules
12th-century biblical manuscripts
Manuscripts of the Vatican Library